The Maine Apartments in Kansas City, Missouri are buildings from 1901. They are listed on the National Register of Historic Places as of 2002.

References

Residential buildings completed in 1901
Buildings and structures in Kansas City, Missouri
Apartment buildings in Missouri
Residential buildings on the National Register of Historic Places in Missouri
National Register of Historic Places in Kansas City, Missouri